The discography of English singer, songwriter, and musician Sam Fender consists of two studio albums and one EP. In November 2017, Fender was named one of the BBC's Sound of 2018, alongside other emerging artists. In November 2018, he released his debut EP, Dead Boys. In 2019, he won the Critics' Choice Brit Award. Later that year, he released his debut studio album, Hypersonic Missiles. The album includes the singles "Play God", "Leave Fast", "Dead Boys", "That Sound", "Hypersonic Missiles", "Will We Talk?", and "The Borders". Fender's second studio album, Seventeen Going Under (2021), includes the titular track which is currently his highest-charting single to date, peaking at number three on the UK Singles Chart.

Albums

Studio albums

Live albums

Extended plays

Singles

As lead artist

As featured artist

Promotional singles

Music videos

Notes

References

Discographies of British artists